is a railway station in the town of Agui, Chita District,  Aichi Prefecture,  Japan, operated by Meitetsu.

Lines

Station layout
The station has two opposed side platforms connected by a level crossing. The platforms are short, and can handle trains of only six carriages or less. The station is unattended.

Platforms

Adjacent stations

Station history
Uedai Station was opened on April 1, 1931 as a station on the Chita Railway. The Chita Railway became part of the Meitetsu group on February 2, 1943. In February 2007, the Tranpass system of magnetic fare cards with automatic turnstiles was implemented, and the station has been unattended since that time.

Passenger statistics
In fiscal 2017, the station was used by an average of 728 passengers daily (boarding passengers only).

Surrounding area
Agui Nanbu Elementary School

See also
 List of Railway Stations in Japan

References

External links

 Official web page 

Railway stations in Japan opened in 1931
Railway stations in Aichi Prefecture
Stations of Nagoya Railroad
Agui, Aichi